Thanthi TV  is a  24-hour Tamil news satellite television channel based in Chennai, India. It is owned by Dina Thanthi.

History
NDTV Hindu was launched on 16 May 2009, owned by NDTV (51%) and The Hindu Group (49%). It was started as a Chennai city-specific English news and entertainment channel, broadcast only in Chennai.

After the Dina Thanthi group took over NDTV Hindu, it rebranded the channel as Thanthi TV. Initially it was a Chennai city-specific channel but after the acquisition process was completed, it was rebranded and relaunched on 13 November 2012 as a 24-hour Tamil news channel which serves and broadcasts to Tamil Nadu, India.

One of the channel's most watched shows is the Kelvikenna Bathil (What is the answer to the question) show, where the show's host interviews various leaders in Tamil Nadu, mainly political leaders. Some of its interviewed people include Narendra Modi.

Election predictions

Thanthi TV commissioned an extensive pre- and post-poll surveys through Krish Info Media for the 2014 Parliamentary and 2016 Assembly elections in Tamil Nadu. The results predicted by the Krish Info Media-Thanti TV combination was the closest to the actual results in both cases. The findings of the 2014 polls were telecasted through a show called 40/40 - Narpadhuku Narpadhu. The findings of the 2016 polls were telecasted through the widely popular show called "Makkal Yaar Pakkam." Both shows were hosted by the former Chief News Editor Rangaraj Pandey and data explained by Krish Info Media's chief Psephologist Arun Krishnamurthy.

See also
 Daily Thanthi
 Thanthi TV
 Malai Malar
 Hello FM

References

External links
 Official website 
 Thanthi TV on YouTube

Television stations in Chennai
24-hour television news channels in India
Tamil-language television channels
Television channels and stations established in 2012
Thanthi Group
Companies based in Chennai
2012 establishments in Tamil Nadu